The 1972 Jean Becker Open, also known as the Paris Open, was a men's tennis tournament played on indoor carpet courts. The event was part of the Grand Prix circuit and classified as a B category tournament. It was the 3rd edition of the Paris Open (later known as the Paris Masters) and took place at the Palais omnisports de Paris-Bercy in Paris, France, from 30 October through 5 November 1972. First-seeded Stan Smith won the singles title.

Finals

Singles

 Stan Smith defeated  Andrés Gimeno 6–2, 6–2, 7–5
 It was Smith's 10th title of the year and the 26th of his career.

Doubles

 Pierre Barthès /  François Jauffret defeated  Andrés Gimeno /  Juan Gisbert Sr. 6–3, 6–2
 It was Barthès' only title of the year and the 4th of his career. It was Jauffret's only title of the year and the 2nd of his career.

References

External links 
 ATP tournament profile